Lachrymatory or lacrymatory may refer to:

 Something that has the effect of lachrymation, causing the secretion of tears
 Tear gas, known formally as a lachrymatory agent or lachrymator
 A lacrymatory, a small vessel of terracotta or glass found in Roman and late Greek tombs, thought to have been used to collect the tears of mourners at funerals